Gateside may refer to:

 Gateside, Fife, Scotland
 Gateside, North Ayrshire, Scotland
 Gateside, Angus, Scotland
 Gateside, Barrhead, a former village now part of the town of Barrhead, East Renfrewshire, Scotland
 Gateside, County Londonderry, a townland in County Londonderry, Northern Ireland